Back in the DHSS is the first album released by the UK rock band Half Man Half Biscuit (HMHB), in 1985.

The album's title puns on that of the 1968 song "Back in the U.S.S.R." by The Beatles: referring to the high unemployment levels at the time of the album's release (the DHSS, Department of Health and Social Security, was the British institution which distributed unemployment benefit).

It was re-released in 2003, compiled with their first EP, The Trumpton Riots EP.

Background 
In 1984, Half Man Half Biscuit started rehearsing at the Vulcan Studios in Liverpool, where Nigel Blackwell was working as the caretaker. One of the people he had got to know was building an 8-track studio in an upstairs room and hired Half Man Half Biscuit for testing the sound quality. Back in the DHSS was recorded for £40 as a result of Blackwell having secured a cut-price deal for the band.

According to the band's official biography, the first label to which Neil Crossley and Nigel Blackwell offered their first album was Skysaw Records in Wallasey, who "said they would love to release it but the swearing was a financial risk". Then Skeleton Records "didn't really do anything except smile and ask if they could use the name as a label to put out a single by Instant Agony ((Blackwell and Crossley) said yes, not expecting any publicity of their own)". Alan Erasmus of Factory Records "chuckled encouragingly and said it was probably unlikely anything would come about."

Geoff Davies of Probe Plus took the original tape and a couple of days later said that he would like to release it. Reportedly, Geoff's then wife, Annie, was a major influence, "being more in tune with the references". The band recorded a few more songs at Vulcan, and the resultant Back In The DHSS LP was sent to John Peel, who "delighted in the savage mockery of minor British celebrities, all wrapped up in tales of the everyday tedium that is life on the dole". The LP topped the UK Indie Chart to become the biggest-selling independent record of 1986.

Track listing

2003 rerelease
 "Busy Little Market Town"
 "God Gave Us Life"
 "Fuckin' 'Ell It's Fred Titmus"
 "Sealclubbing"
 "99% of Gargoyles Look Like Bob Todd"
 "Time Flies By (When You're the Driver of a Train)"
 "I Hate Nerys Hughes (From the Heart)"
 "The Len Ganley Stance"
 "Venus in Flares"
 "I Love You Because (You Look Like Jim Reeves)"
 "Reflections in a Flat"
 "I Left My Heart in Papworth General"
 "Architecture and Morality Ted and Alice"
 "Albert Hammond Bootleg"
 "1966 and All That"
 "The Trumpton Riots"
 "All I Want for Christmas Is a Dukla Prague Away Kit"

The above is the correct song order; the track listing on the 2003 release was incorrect, placing "The Trumpton Riots" at number 13, so putting the last five songs into an incorrect order.

Tracks 1317 were first released in 1986 on The Trumpton Riots EP.

Cultural references 
HMHB have always slyly quoted or parodied cultural, musical and other sources. The ones identified on this album include:
 "God Gave Us Life". John the Baptist ("Jordan dipper, splashed Our Lord, head chopped off at Salome's behest")*, Una Stubbs, Little and Large ("Seriously unfunny comedy duo who once got Kevin Keegan to sing to millions. Bastards"), Keith Harris ("Mediocre ventriloquist, had a hit with "Orville's Song"), Wendy Craig ("Star of Butterflies, Carla Lane abomination sitcom"), Thora Hird, Matthew Kelly ("Presenter of Game for a Laughhas moved on to other crimes against humanity"), Eartha Kitt, Isla St Clair ("On The Generation Game with Larry Grayson, other things as well"), Lionel Blair ("Dancer. Led the opposing team to Una on Give Us a Clue"), Pontius Pilate, Bobby Charlton, Gordon Jackson.
 "Fuckin' 'Ell It's Fred Titmus". Lenor, Fred Titmus ("England bowler and ex-England selector, slightly deficient in the toe department. Has played first class cricket in five decades (1949-82), probably unique, post-war"), Dracula ("Gary Oldman, I think"), Transylvania ( Gary's locale in L.A. Or perhaps it's in Romania...), Stevie Nicks.
 "Sealclubbing". Nightclubbing (indirect: David Essex's song this title is the pun on), Haliborange (fish oil and orange vitamin pills).
 "99% Of Gargoyles Look Like Bob Todd". Jesus Christ, Bob Todd ("One of the two ugly blokes on the Benny Hill Show, the one who didn't receive punishment"), James Dean, Marilyn Monroe, Jimmy Clitheroe ("Сomedian, perennial naughty-schoolboy, died on the day of his mother's cremation"), "If you've ever wondered how you get triangles from a cow" ("Refers to the Dairylea soft cheese adverts). John Noakes, Lesley Judd.
 "Time Flies By (When You're the Driver of a Train)". Based on the Chigley song of the same name. The opening notes are the theme tune to Camberwick Green; Camberwick (Camberwick Green); Pugh, Pugh, Barney McGrew, Cuthbert, Dibble and Grubb – The Trumpton fire brigade; "Careful with that spliff, Eugene" (Pink Floyd reference).
 "I Hate Nerys Hughes". Nerys Hughes, St Vitus, Social, Supplementary ("The Dept. of Health and Social Security. Supplementary Benefit, money given by the DHSS to unemployed people without sufficient National Insurance contributions. Then renamed Income Support, and now lumped with Unemployment Benefit into Jobseeker's Allowance"), Bath ("Spa town – was in the now defunct county of Avon")
 "The Len Ganley Stance". Len Ganley, Crucible ("Sheffield theatre, home to annual World Snooker Championships, presented by David Vine, of course"), Locomotion, Mashed Potato ("1960s dances based on single songs"), Andy Warhol.
 "Venus In Flares". Title refers to "Venus in Furs" by The Velvet Underground. "A million housewives..." (reference to old Heinz beans advert), "Portrait in the snow" ("Some people allege that viewed from an aeroplane, you can see Christ's face when looking down on the Alps, hence, I can see..."), Robert Powell, Kojak, C&A, "The Grand Old Duke of York..." (Nursery rhyme), George (George Savalas) was Telly's brother (he appeared in Kojak).
 "I Love You Because (You Look Like Jim Reeves)". "I Love You Because" was a 1964 hit for Jim Reeves, Peggy Mount ("Now a dame, actress. Not a babe"), Arctic Roll ("89p from Sainsbury's"), Skidoo (A C5 on skis), Shake n' Vac ("...The TV ad had an infectious song, complete with dance: "Do the Shake n' Vac and put the freshness back...". Frank Sidebottom has covered it in Firm Favourite Ads"), Llandudno ("North Wales town where people go to die"), Tony Bastable.
 "Reflections In A Flat". Echo & The Bunnymen, Ali Bongo ("...Apparently directly descended from William Wallace (Ali's real name too?) of Braveheart and Stirling monument fame. Has from time to time had his own show, but basically acts as "magical advisor" to the likes of Paul Daniels, and formerly to..."), David Nixon ("Another prestidigitator, and now dead. Looked very much like FW de Klerk"), Marks & Spencer, Lech Walesa.

References

1985 debut albums
Half Man Half Biscuit albums